The US3 carriers commonly refer to three full-service airlines based in the United States:
American Airlines
Delta Air Lines
United Airlines